Samantha Colley (22 March 1989) is an English actress having had roles in various theatre and television productions, including playing the lover of both Albert Einstein and Pablo Picasso in the National Geographic TV series Genius.

Education 
Colley studied at the Oxford School of Drama where, as a student, she performed in productions of Anna Karenina, The Taming of the Shrew, and Pride and Prejudice.

Career 
In 2014, Colley made her stage debut in The Crucible at The Old Vic theatre in London. Colley was nominated for Best Supporting Actress in a Play at the 2015 WhatsOnStage Awards for her performance as Abigail Williams, but lost out to Rachelle Ann Go.

In 2017, Colley starred as Mileva Marić in Genius, the ten-part television series for National Geographic and Fox 21 about the life and work of Albert Einstein. In 2018, Colley reappeared in the second season of Genius, playing Dora Maar the lover of Picasso, who was played by Antonio Banderas.

Theatre

Filmography

Film

Television

Awards and nominations

References

External links 
Colley at IMDb
Instagram

1987 births
Actresses from Devon
Alumni of the Oxford School of Drama
British actresses
Date of birth missing (living people)
Living people
People from Canterbury